Halomonas nitroreducens is a Gram-negative halophilic Pseudomonadota, that is able to respire on nitrate and nitrite in anaerobiosis.

Halomonas nitroreducenss closest relatives are Halomonas alimentaria, H. denitrificans, H. organivorans, and H. ventosa. The bacterium was studied taxonomically from a strain taken from a solar saltern in Cáhuil, Pichilemu, Chile, by the University of Granada.

References

External links
Type strain of Halomonas nitroreducens at BacDive -  the Bacterial Diversity Metadatabase

Oceanospirillales
Bacteria described in 2008